Eutomostethus luteiventris is a species of sawflies belonging to the family Tenthredinidae, subfamily Blennocampinae.

Distribution and habitat
This species is present in the Nearctic realm and in most of Europe, with exception of the Balkan and Iberian Peninsula. It mainly inhabits wet meadows and hedge rows.

Description

Head, antennae and thorax are shining black. Abdomen is orange, with black basal plates and apical segments. Wings are rather infuscate. Legs are mainly orange, but the apical half of the forefemurs are black.

Biology
Adults can be found in May and July, while larvae are present in July and August. Adults feed on nectar of Anthriscus sylvestris, while larvae are monophagous, feeding only on Juncaceae (Juncus articulatus, Juncus conglomeratus and Juncus effusus).

References

External links
 Bug Guide
 D & JP Balmer

Tenthredinidae
Hymenoptera of Europe
Insects described in 1814